The Frontier Formation is a sedimentary geological formation whose strata date back to the Late Cretaceous.  The formation's extents are: northwest Colorado, southeast Idaho, southern Montana, northern Utah, and western Wyoming.  It occurs in many sedimentary basins and uplifted areas.

The formation is described by W.G. Pierce as thick, lenticular, grey sandstone, gray shale, carbonaceous shale, and bentonite.

Dinosaur remains are among the fossils that have been recovered from the formation.

Vertebrate paleofauna
 Nodosaurus textilis
 Stegopelta landerensis - "Partial postcranium, osteoderms, [and] fragments of skull."
Hadrosauroidea indet. Footprints (Upper)

Other paleofauna 

 Callichimaera perplexa

See also

 List of dinosaur-bearing rock formations

References

Geologic formations of the United States
Cretaceous geology of Utah
Cenomanian Stage
Cretaceous geology of Wyoming